Zhang Xingqian (16 October 1921 – 29 July 2022) was a Chinese metal physicist who was a professor at the China Academy of Engineering Physics, and an academician of the Chinese Academy of Sciences.

Biography
Zhang was born in Wuyi County, Zhili (now Hebei), on 16 October 1921. In 1935, he was accepted to the Mechanical Engineering Department of Higher Vocational School of Hebei Institute of Technology (now Hebei University of Technology) in Tianjin. In the summer of 1936, he dropped out of school and went south to Shanghai, and enrolled at Jiangsu Provincial Shanghai High School. In the autumn of 1937, the Imperial Japanese Army occupied Shanghai. After refusing the solicitation of the Kuomintang spy, he endured malaria and applied for university in Wuhan. He joined the Chinese Communist Party (CCP) in March 1940. After graduating from Wuhan University in 1942, he was assigned to the Qijiang Electrochemical Metallurgical Plant in southwest China's Sichuan. In August 1946, he was transferred to the Anshan Iron and Steel Co., Ltd. in northeast China's Liaoning. In 1947, he pursued advanced studies in the United States, first earning master of metallurgy degree from Case Western Reserve University in 1949 and then doctor of metallurgy degree from Massachusetts Institute of Technology in 1952.

In June 1955, Zhang embarked on the journey for China. He arrived at Luohu Port in Shenzhen by steamer Gordon on 10 July, and before long he became a professor of Beijing Iron and Steel Institute (now University of Science and Technology Beijing). Starting in 1963, he successively served as director of the Test Department, deputy chief engineer, deputy director and chief engineer at the Ninth Research Institute of the Second Ministry of Machine Building.

On 29 July 2022, he died from an illness in Beijing, at the age of 100.

Honours and awards
 1982 State Science and Technology Progress Award (First Class)
 1985 State Science and Technology Progress Award (Special)
 1991 Member of the Chinese Academy of Sciences (CAS)
 2002 Science and Technology Progress Award of the Ho Leung Ho Lee Foundation

References

1921 births
2022 deaths
People from Wuyi County, Hebei
Physicists from Hebei
National Wuhan University alumni
Case Western Reserve University alumni
Massachusetts Institute of Technology alumni
Academic staff of the University of Science and Technology Beijing
Members of the Chinese Academy of Sciences
Chinese nuclear engineers
Chinese centenarians
Men centenarians